David Francey (born 1954) is a Canadian folk singer-songwriter. He is the recipient of three Juno Awards and three Canadian Folk Music Awards.

Early life
Francey was born in Ayrshire, Scotland. He immigrated to Canada with his family at age 12. He has no formal training in music.

Career
Francey worked as a rail yard worker and a carpenter for 20 years.  At age 45, he began a career in folk music, finding success on the folk festival circuit, where he continues to perform.

Francey's experiences in working-class life strongly influenced his 1999 debut album, Torn Screen Door, which featured the songs "Gypsy Boys", "Hard Steel Mill", "Working Poor", and "Torn Screen Door."  Other musical themes include admiration of the natural beauty of the Canadian landscape and traditional folk themes of love and loss.

From 1997 to 2004, Francey was accompanied on guitar by Canadian guitarist/producer Dave Clarke. During that period, Clarke co-produced Francey's first three albums, including the Juno-winning Far End of Summer and Skating Rink.

His 2004 album, The Waking Hour, is a collaboration with traditional country artists Kieran Kane, Kevin Welch and Fats Kaplin, and includes some of his darker material, including "Wishing Well" about the execution of Timothy McVeigh, and "Fourth of July", a political commentary on the post-September 11 United States. In 2004, David Francey won first prize of the Folk Category of the 9th Annual USA Songwriting Competition.

Accompanied by fellow Canadian guitarist Shane Simpson until October 2006, Francey toured various locations across Canada, the United States, England, Scotland, and Australia.  In October 2006, Francey toured with New Hampshire-based singer-songwriter Craig Werth, co-producer of Francey's 2007 release, Right of Passage.  Noted Canadian guitarist Mark Westberg met Francey in 1999 at Bishop's University and accompanied him occasionally on tour until 2011, when he joined Francey as his primary guitarist.

His 2009 album Seaway is a collaboration with Mike Ford, former member of Moxy Früvous. It is a collection of songs inspired by their voyage on M.S. Algoville.

In 2010, his song "The Waking Hour" won the Session I Grand Prize in the Folk category in John Lennon Songwriting Contest.

In 2011 he released an album, Late Edition.

In 2016, Francey won two Canadian Folk Music Awards, solo artist and contemporary album of the year, for his album Empty Train.

Personal life

Francey currently lives in Elphin, Ontario with his wife Beth Girdler.

Awards and nominations
Winner, 2002 Juno Award, Best Roots & Traditional Album - Solo, for Far End of Summer
Winner, 2002 Penguin Eggs Magazine's Album Of The Year - Solo, for Far End Of Summer
Winner, 2003 Penguin Eggs Magazine's Album Of The Year - Solo, for Skating Rink
Winner, 2004 Juno Award, Best Roots & Traditional Album - Solo, for Skating Rink
Winner, First Prize (Folk), 9th Annual USA Songwriting Competition
Nomination, 2005 Juno Award, Best Roots & Traditional Album - Solo, for The Waking Hour
Winner, 2007 Canadian Folk Music Awards, Best Singer - Contemporary, for Right of Passage
Winner, 2008 Juno Award, Best Roots & Traditional Album - Solo, for Right of Passage
Nomination, 2010 Canadian Folk Music Awards, Best Contemporary Album - Collaboration, for Seaway 
Winner, 2010 7th Annual IAMA (International Acoustic Music Awards)
Nomination, 2011 Canadian Folk Music Awards, Solo Artist Of The Year
Nomination, 2011 Canadian Folk Music Awards, English Songwriter Of The Year
Nomination, 2012 Juno Award, Best Roots & Traditional Album - Solo, for Late Edition
Nomination, 2012 Juno Award, Best Music DVD Of The Year - Burning Bright
Nomination, 2014 Juno Award, Best Roots & Traditional Album - Solo, for So Say We All

Discography
Torn Screen Door (1999)
Far End of Summer (2001)
Skating Rink (2003)
The Waking Hour (2004) with Kevin Welch, Kieran Kane and Fats Kaplin
The First Set (2006)
Carols for a Christmas Eve (2006)
Right of Passage (2007)
Seaway (2009)
Late Edition (2011)
So Say We All (2013)
Empty Train (2016)
''The Broken Heart of Everything (2018)

References

External links
The Official David Francey Website
2005 Biographical article
USA Songwriting Competition
John Lennon Songwriting Contest

Living people
1954 births
Canadian folk singer-songwriters
Canadian male singer-songwriters
Juno Award for Roots & Traditional Album of the Year – Solo winners
People from East Ayrshire
Scottish emigrants to Canada
Canadian Folk Music Award winners
Red House Records artists